The 2007 Constable elections in Jersey were the last before a revised election system was introduced to the island in 2008, resulting in some elected Constables serving terms of less than 15 months.

Constable elections in 2007
Constable elections are normally for a period of four years. From 2008, all Constables would be elected on a single day, and all terms would be cut short to allow for this. Thus all elections in 2007 were for a period until that date.

Terms expiring in 2007
St. Peter Tom du Feu 02.07.07
Grouville Dan Murphy 23.07.07
St. Saviour Philip Ozouf 13.08.07
St. Clement Derek Gray 17.12.07
St. Helier Alan Simon Crowcroft 17.12.07

Constable of St Peter
Nominations Date: 14 June 2007

Candidates
Tom Du Feu
Unopposed

Constable of Grouville
Election Date: 25 July 2007

Candidates
Dan Murphy 1,040
Peter Le Maistre 641
Turnout 53.2%, Spoilt Papers

Constable of St Saviour
Nominations Date: 25 July 2007

Candidates
Peter Hanning
Unopposed

Constable of St Clement

Constable of St Helier

Election took place 9 January 2008 (Crowcroft win)

Two candidates:

Alvin Aaron, JDA candidate
Simon Crowcroft (incumbent Constable), Independent

References

Constable 2007
2007 elections in Europe
Constable election